Curtis Gonzales (born 26 January 1989) is a Trinidad and Tobago international footballer who plays for Defence Force, as a defender.

Career
Gonzales has played club football for Ma Pau and Defence Force.

He made his international debut for Trinidad and Tobago in 2012.

References

1989 births
Living people
Trinidad and Tobago footballers
Trinidad and Tobago international footballers
Association football defenders
Ma Pau Stars S.C. players
Defence Force F.C. players
TT Pro League players
2013 CONCACAF Gold Cup players
2009 CONCACAF U-20 Championship players
2021 CONCACAF Gold Cup players